For chemical reactions, the iron oxide cycle (Fe3O4/FeO) is the original two-step thermochemical cycle proposed for use for hydrogen production.
It is based on the reduction and subsequent oxidation of iron ions, particularly the reduction and oxidation between Fe3+ and Fe2+. The ferrites, or iron oxide, begins in the form of a spinel and depending on the reaction conditions, dopant metals and support material forms either Wüstites or different spinels.

Process description
The thermochemical two-step water splitting process uses two redox steps. The steps of solar hydrogen production by iron based two-step cycle are:

 

Where M can by any number of metals, often Fe itself, Co, Ni, Mn, Zn or mixtures thereof. 

The  oxidative water splitting step (2) occurs at a lower ~ temperature which produces the original ferrite material in addition to hydrogen gas. The temperature level is realized by using geothermal heat from magma or a solar power tower and a set of heliostats to collect the solar thermal energy.

Hercynite cycle 
Like the traditional iron oxide cycle, the hercynite is based on the oxidation and reduction of iron atoms. However unlike the traditional cycle, the ferrite material reacts with a second metal oxide, aluminum oxide, rather than simply decomposing. The reactions take place via the following two reactions:
 
The reduction step of the hercynite reaction takes place at temperature ~  lower than the traditional water splitting cycle. This leads to lower radiation losses, which scale as temperature to the fourth power.

Advantages and disadvantages
The advantages of the ferrite cycles are: they have lower reduction temperatures than other 2-step systems, no metallic gasses are produced, high specific H2 production capacity, non-toxicity of the elements used and abundance of the constituent elements.

The disadvantages of the ferrite cycles are: similar reduction and melting temperature of the spinels (except for the hercynite cycle as aluminates have very high melting temperatures), and slow rates of the oxidation, or water splitting, reaction.

See also
 Cerium(IV) oxide-cerium(III) oxide cycle
 Copper-chlorine cycle
 Hybrid sulfur cycle
 Hydrosol-2
 Sulfur-iodine cycle
 Zinc zinc-oxide cycle

References

External links
Solar hydrogen from iron oxide based thermochemical cycles

Chemical reactions
Hydrogen production